Dimi de Jong (born 1 September 1994, The Hague) is a Dutch snowboarder. He has competed at the 2014 Winter Olympics in Sochi.

References

1994 births
Living people
Dutch male snowboarders
Olympic snowboarders of the Netherlands
Snowboarders at the 2014 Winter Olympics
Sportspeople from The Hague